Boquilobo Bog Nature Reserve is a marshland and nature reserve located near Golegã, central Portugal. It is a UNESCO biosphere reserve since 1981 and a Ramsar wetland since 1996.

Due to its inland position, the wetland is dependent on the Tagus basin, along with one of its tributaries, the Almonda. As expected, the nature reserve is dominated by plant species associated with humid environments such as the lakeshore bulrush, the southern cattail or Juncus. In the arboreal layer, in temporarily flooded areas, willow groves dominate, especially white willow, which form small islands of vegetation and even dense thickets. Among the fish, the European eel and two Portuguese endemisms stand out, Achondrostoma oligolepis and the Iberian nase. Among the amphibians there are four Iberian endemisms and 27 species of mammals are counted. Due to its status, the occurrence of the European pond turtle should also be mentioned.

The high ornithological value is attested by the presence of about 221 species of birds, especially herons, such as the western cattle egret, the little egret, the black-crowned night heron, the grey heron, the purple heron and the squacco heron. The Eurasian spoonbill has here one of its few nesting sites in Portugal. It has a large wintering duck population, namely northern pintail and common pochard.

The symbol of the park is the white heron. The reserve is home to the largest number of white herons in the Iberian peninsula, and they are found there from February/March until the summer.

References

External links
 Reserva Natural do Paul do Boquilobo - 

Biosphere reserves of Portugal
Nature reserves in Portugal
Ramsar sites in Portugal
Geography of Santarém District
Tourist attractions in Santarém District
Natura 2000 in Portugal
Golegã